The 2017 South Korean Figure Skating Championships were held from January 6–8, 2017 at the Gangneung Ice Arena in Gangneung. It was organized by Korea Skating Union. This was the 71st edition of those championships held.

Skaters competed in the disciplines of men's singles, ladies' singles, pair skating, and ice dancing on the senior, junior levels for the title of national champion of South Korea. The results of the national championships were used to choose the Korean teams to the 2017 World Junior Championships and 2017 World Championships.

The Korea Skating Union published the list of entries on December 28, 2016. Cha Jun-hwan won his first national title. Lim Eun-soo also won her first title.

Senior results

Senior men

Senior ladies

Senior pairs

Senior ice dance

International team selections

Winter Universiade 
Based on the results of the 2016 KSU President Cup Ranking Competition from October 14–16, 2016.

Four Continents Championships
Based on the results of the 2016 KSU President Cup Ranking Competition from October 14–16, 2016.

Asian Winter Games
Based on the results of the 2016 KSU President Cup Ranking Competition from October 14–16, 2016.

World Junior Championships

World Championships

References

External links
 

South Korean Figure Skating Championships
South Korean Figure Skating Championships, 2017
Figure skating
January 2017 sports events in South Korea